Porte di Rendena is a comune in the northern Italian province of Trento of the Trentino Alto Adige region. It was created on 1 January 2016 after the merger of the communes of Darè, Vigo Rendena and Villa Rendena.

References

External links
Official website

Cities and towns in Trentino-Alto Adige/Südtirol